Maxim Pavlovich Kovtun (born 18 June 1995) is a retired Russian figure skater. He is a three-time European medalist (silver in 2015 and 2017, bronze in 2016) and four-time (2014, 2015, 2016, 2019) Russian national champion. On the junior level, he is the 2012 JGP Final champion. Kovtun has successfully landed two quad jumps in a short program, and three quads in a free program.

On 23 April 2019, Kovtun announced his retirement from competition.

Personal life 
Maxim Pavlovich Kovtun was born 18 June 1995 in Yekaterinburg. His two older brothers formerly competed in figure skating and his father, Pavel, is a skating coach and former pair skater. He was in a relationship with a gymnast Chilita Bagdzhi from 2015 until 2016. He has been dating a Russian group rhythmic gymnast Evgeniia Levanova since 2019.

Career 

Taken to the ice rink by his father, Kovtun began skating at age four in Yekaterinburg and was coached mainly by Maria Voitsekhovskaia in his early years. He also trained in ice hockey but chose skating at age ten.

2011–12 season: JGP and senior debuts 
In the spring of 2011, Kovtun began training with Nikolai Morozov. He debuted on the ISU Junior Grand Prix (JGP) circuit in the 2011–12 season, winning gold at his first event in Romania and then silver in Estonia. He qualified for the 2011–12 JGP Final where he finished fourth. At the 2012 Russian Championships, Kovtun finished twelfth on the senior level and won the bronze medal on the junior level. He was assigned to the 2012 World Team Trophy—his first senior international event—following Sergei Voronov's injury-related withdrawal. He finished twelfth at the event.

2012–13 season: Gold at JGP Final 
In the summer of 2012, Kovtun switched coaches to Elena Buianova (Vodorezova). He began the 2012–13 season by winning a pair of gold medals at JGP events in Croatia and Germany. In Croatia, he scored a personal best 80.00 points in free skating TES. Kovtun qualified for the JGP Final in Sochi, Russia, where he won gold by eleven points over silver medalist Joshua Farris. At the event, he scored 149.78 points for his free skate which included a 4T-3T, 3A-3T and 3A.

Kovtun said he would try two quads in his free program at the 2013 Russian Championships. Although he finished fifth on the senior level, he was named in the Russian team to the 2013 European Championships because Russian regulations guaranteed berths only to the top two finishers while a committee had the right to choose the third entry. In his European debut, Kovtun placed seventh in the short program, fourth in the free skate, and fifth overall with a total score of 226.57 points. In the free skate, his fourth combination (3S-2T) was deemed invalid. Kovtun finished seventeenth in his first World Championships, held in London, Ontario, Canada. He was eighth in the men's event at the 2013 World Team Trophy and Team Russia finished fourth.

2013–14 season: First senior national title 
Kovtun found his short program for the 2013–14 season very challenging, stating, "When we [began training the program], it was just hell. [...] I needed half an hour to learn one step, so it took a very long time to put this all together." He made his senior Grand Prix debut at the 2013 Cup of China. He placed second in the short—landing a 4S-3T, 4T and 3A—and first in the free skate, in which he landed a 4S, 4S-2T, 3A-2T and 3A. Kovtun won the silver medal overall behind China's Han Yan. He won another silver medal at the 2013 Rostelecom Cup. The results qualified him to his first senior Grand Prix Final. He finished fifth at the event in Fukuoka, Japan.

At the 2014 Russian Championships, Kovtun placed second in the short program and first in the free skate. He was awarded the gold medal ahead of three-time Olympic medalist Evgeni Plushenko. After Kovtun again placed fifth at the European Championships, Russia's sole spot in the men's event at the 2014 Winter Olympics in Sochi was assigned to Plushenko. Kovtun was sent to the 2014 World Championships in Saitama, Japan. He placed seventh in the short program, fifth in the free skate, and finished fourth overall behind Spain's Javier Fernández.

2014–15 season: Silver at Europeans 
For the 2014–15 Grand Prix season, Kovtun was assigned to compete at the Cup of China and Trophée Bompard. He placed first in both segments to win the gold medal in China, ahead of the Olympic champion, Yuzuru Hanyu, and Richard Dornbush. He then won the gold medal in France ahead of Tatsuki Machida and Denis Ten. Kovtun qualified to the Grand Prix Final as the only skater that won both of his assignments. He placed third in the short program, skating last, and then fifth in the free skate, finishing fourth overall behind his teammate Sergei Voronov.

At the 2015 Russian Championships, Kovtun won his second national title. At the 2015 European Championships, he ranked fourth in the short program and second in the free skate, ending in second place overall, behind Javier Fernández. He then finished seventh at the 2015 World Championships in Shanghai, China.

2015–16 season 
Kovtun started the 2015–16 season with gold at the 2015 CS Mordovian Ornament. Turning to the Grand Prix series, he placed second in the short program (SP) at the 2015 Trophée Éric Bompard. Due to the November 2015 Paris attacks, the free skate was cancelled and the SP standings were deemed the final results. Kovtun finished tenth at his second GP event, the 2015 NHK Trophy, which meant he did not qualify for the Final. In December, he won his third consecutive national title, at the 2016 Russian Championships in his home city of Yekaterinburg.

In late January, Kovtun was awarded the bronze medal at the 2016 European Championships in Bratislava, having placed second in the short and sixth in the free. He finished 18th at the 2016 World Championships in Boston. On 16 May 2016, Buyanova announced that Kovtun had left her group and joined Inna Goncharenko.

2016–17 season 
After taking the bronze medal at the 2016 CS Finlandia Trophy, Kovtun finished seventh at both of his Grand Prix assignments, the 2016 Skate America and 2016 Cup of China. At the 2017 Russian Championships, he received the bronze medal, having finished third to Mikhail Kolyada and Alexander Samarin. He said that he had begun consulting a psychologist. He won the silver medal at the 2017 European Championships, earning new personal bests in the short program, free skate and overall. He placed eleventh at the 2017 World Championships.

2017–18 season 
Kovtun withdrew from the 2017 Finlandia Trophy and his first Grand Prix assignment, 2017 Skate Canada, due to a back injury. Kovtun competed in the short program at 2017 Skate America, placing twelfth, and withdrew as a result of continued back and knee problems.  At the 2018 Russian Championships, he placed sixteenth in the short program, and again withdrew. Commenting afterward on his disappointing result, Kovtun said it was a "novel experience" and that he "was physically unable to train, simply because I could not bend down to tie my laces and then straighten up again." He resumed training in February 2018.

2018–19 season 

Coached by Elena Buianova and Alexander Uspenski at CSKA Moscow, Kovtun began his season by winning the gold medal at the 2018 CS Tallinn Trophy. Competing at the 2019 Russian Championships, he placed first in both the short program and the free skate to claim his fourth Russian national title.

At the 2019 European Championships, Kovtun placed fifth in the short program.  He had serious problems in the free skate, popping several of his planned quad and triple jumps, and as a result placed sixteenth in the free and dropped to fourteenth overall.

In March 2019, he took silver at the 2019 Winter Universiade in Krasnoyarsk, Russia. Kovtun withdrew from the 2019 World Championships, citing medical reasons.

On 23 April 2019, Kovtun announced his retirement from competitive skating.

Programs

Competitive highlights 
GP: Grand Prix; CS: Challenger Series; JGP: Junior Grand Prix

Detailed results

Senior level 
Small medals for short and free programs awarded only at ISU Championships. At team events, medals awarded for team results only.

Junior level

References

External links 

 
 Maxim Kovtun at fskate.ru 
 

1995 births
Russian male single skaters
European Figure Skating Championships medalists
Living people
Sportspeople from Yekaterinburg
Universiade silver medalists for Russia
Universiade medalists in figure skating
Competitors at the 2019 Winter Universiade